Immediate mode may refer to

 Immediate mode (computer graphics), a graphical rendering mode
 Immediate mode GUI, GUI or widget toolkit implemented using immediate mode style
 Direct mode, an operational mode for interpreters